The 1893–94 French Rugby Union Championship was won by Stade Français that defeated Inter-Nos in the final.

The tournament was played by five clubs from the Paris region, three from Paris :Stade Français, Racing, and Inter-Nos, and two from Asnières : the Association Sportive d'Asnières and the Cercle Pédestre d'Asnières.

The final was lost by In Inter-Nos, which had defeated C.P. Asnières in semifinal, and won by the Stade français that had ousted the  Racing (9–0).

Finale

External links
 Compte rendu de la finale de 1894, sur lnr.fr

1894
France
Championship